Events from the year 1532 in art.

Events
 German painter Hans Holbein the Younger settles permanently in England.
 Venetian painter Lorenzo Lotto moves to Treviso.

Works

 Lucas Cranach the Elder – Melancholy
 Lorenzo Lotto
 Messer Marsilio and his Wife
 Portrait of a Woman Inspired by Lucretia (approximate date)
 St. Lucy before the Judge
 Titian – Andrea dei Franceschi
 Hans Holbein
 Portrait of Georg Gisze
 Terminus, the Device of Erasmus (sculpture)
 Pontormo – Portrait of a lady in red (approximate date)

Births
 Sofonisba Anguissola, Italian painter of the Renaissance (died 1625)
 Giovanni Battista della Marca, Italian painter (died 1587)
 Dominicus Lampsonius, Flemish poet and artist (died 1599)
 Girolamo Muziano, painter (died 1592)
 Marten de Vos, Antwerp painter and draughtsman (died 1603)

Deaths
 Ulrich Apt the Elder, German Late-Gothic painter (born 1460)
 Albert Cornelis, Flemish Renaissance painter (born 1475)
 Tullio Lombardo, Italian Renaissance sculptor (born 1460)
 Bernardino Luini, North Italian painter from Leonardo's circle (born 1480/1482)
 Jan Mabuse, Flemish painter (born 1478)
 Andrea Riccio, Italian sculptor and occasional architect (born 1470)

References

 
Years of the 16th century in art